"Le lac" is a song by Julien Doré released in July 2016.

Chart performance

Weekly charts

Year-end charts

References

2016 singles
2016 songs
French-language songs
SNEP Top Singles number-one singles